Stephanie Bissonnette (October 26, 1990 – December 17, 2022) was an American stage choreographer who was known for her work in the musical Mean Girls, where she originated the role of Dawn Schweitzer. She was also featured in Ensemble, the Broadway on Demand documentary that told the stories of Broadway dancers navigating the COVID-19 shutdown.

Bissonnette was a graduate of Point Park University's Conservatory of the Performing Arts. In addition to her stage work, she served as a choreographer for productions at The Muny, Riverside Theatre, Seven Angels Theatre, and Shakespeare Theatre Company. She was diagnosed with medulloblastoma in 2019, and she died at age 32 on December 17, 2022.

References

1990 births
2022 deaths
Mean Girls (franchise)
American choreographers
American women choreographers
Point Park University alumni